Samu or SAMU may refer to:

Places
 Samu, Sierra Leone
 Samu, South Khorasan, a village in South Khorasan Province, Iran
 As-Samu, a town in the Hebron Governorate of the West Bank
 Samu, Sarawak, Malaysia, a settlement near Kerangan Pinggai
 SAMU, the ICAO code of Uspallata Airport, Mendoza, Argentina

People
 Samu (surname)
 Samu (given name)
 Samu (footballer) (born 1996), Portuguese footballer

Wrestlers with the ring name Samu
 Samula Anoaʻi (born 1963), Samoan-American professional wrestler
 C. W. Anderson (born 1971), American professional wrestler

Ambulance and medical organizations
 , a municipal humanitarian emergency service in several cities in France and worldwide
 , see Emergency medical services in France
 , a specialised emergency system of Madrid; see S.A.M.U.R.

Other uses
 Samu (Zen), work that encourages mindfulness, practiced in Zen
 Samu language, a Lolo–Burmese language native to Yunnan Province, Southwest China
 Samu, a short name for Bengali blogging website Somewhere in... blog